Margarosticha papuensis is a moth in the family Crambidae. It was described by Eugene G. Munroe in 1959. It is found on New Guinea.

References

Acentropinae
Moths described in 1959